Dodig is a surname.  Notable people with this surname include:

 Goran Dodig, Croatian politician, president of Croatian Demochristian Party
 Ivan Dodig, Croatian tennis player
 Markica Dodig, Bosnian bocce player, two-time Bosnia and Herzegovina Sportsperson of the Year
 Radoslav Dodig, Croatian archaeologist and journalist
 Victor G. Dodig, Canadian banking executive
 Vladimir Dodig Trokut, Croatian artist, art collector and museologist

See also
 Dodik

Croatian surnames
Slavic-language surnames